Klobikau is a former municipality in the Saalekreis district, Saxony-Anhalt, Germany. Since January 2008, it is part of the town Bad Lauchstädt.

Former municipalities in Saxony-Anhalt
Saalekreis